MOEX may refer to:

Mitsui Oil Exploration, a Japanese oil exploration company
MOEX Russia Index, a stock market index based on the Moscow Exchange
Moscow Exchange, a Russian trading exchange